The Anatolian Plate is a continental tectonic plate that is separated from the Eurasian plate and the Arabian plate by the North Anatolian Fault and the East Anatolian Fault respectively. Most of the country of Turkey is located on the Anatolian plate. Most significant earthquakes in the region have historically occurred along the northern fault, such as the 1939 Erzincan earthquake. The devastating 2023 Turkey–Syria earthquake occurred along the active East Anatolian fault at a strike slip fault where the Arabian plate is sliding past the Anatolian plate horizontally.

According to the American Museum of Natural History, the Anatolian transform fault system is "probably the most active in the world".  The East Anatolian Fault, a left lateral transform fault, forms a boundary with the Arabian Plate. To the south and southwest is a convergent boundary with the African Plate. This convergence manifests in compressive features within the oceanic crust beneath the Mediterranean as well as within the continental crust of Anatolia itself, and also by what are generally considered to be subduction zones along the Hellenic and Cyprus arcs. The northern edge is a transform boundary with the Eurasian Plate, forming the North Anatolian Fault Zone (NAFZ). 

Research indicates that the Anatolian Plate is rotating counterclockwise as it is being pushed west by the Arabian Plate, impeded from any northerly movement by the Eurasian Plate. In some references, the Anatolian Plate is referred to as a "block" of continental crust still coupled to the Eurasian Plate.  But studies of the North Anatolian Fault indicate that Anatolia is de-coupled from the Eurasian Plate.  It is now being squeezed by the Arabian Plate from the east and forced toward the west as the Eurasian Plate to its north is blocking motion in that direction.  The African Plate is subducting beneath the Anatolian Plate along the Cyprus and Hellenic Arcs offshore in the Mediterranean Sea.

See also
 Aegean Sea Plate

References

External links
 

Tectonic plates
Geology of Turkey